Assereto is a surname. Notable people with the surname include:

Biagio Assereto ( 1383–1456), Italian admiral
Gerolamo Assereto (1543–1627), 87th Doge of the Republic of Genoa
Gioacchino Assereto (1600–1649), Italian painter

Italian-language surnames